Ana Tzarev (born 1937) is a Croatian artist.

Early life
Ana Tzarev was born Marija Guina in Trogir, Croatia, and her mother was Anka Carev. She "started out as a dressmaker".

In 1956, she met Robert Chandler, whom she married in Split. They then moved to New Zealand, where she studied fashion design, and the two started the Chandler House department store, with Tzarev designing clothing sold there. Chandler House achieved national success, becoming a chain of ten stores, and was sold in 1986 for $10 million.

Artistic career

In December 2008, she opened the Ana Tzarev Gallery at 24 West 57th Street close to Fifth Avenue, New York.

The 14,000 square feet, two-floor gallery was designed by James Harb Architects, and only shows her work, with the first exhibition being entitled Voyage of Discovery, even though she had "never sold a painting or held a public viewing of her work". The rent on the gallery space was $2 million a year, and her billionaire son Richard Chandler loaned her $4 million to launch the gallery. 

Ana Tzarev Gallery, described in Art News and The New York Observer as a "vanity gallery", later closed. In December 2015, the space which by then had an annual asking rent of $3.7 million was taken on by the Qatar-based travel brand Mosafer.

Meanwhile others laud her work such as Alexander Borovsky, curator of Contemporary Art at the Russian Museum who wrote of her work ..."She [Ana Tzarev] has developed a powerful gestural style with an energy not unlike that of the post-impressionist era: an open colour, a three-dimensional brush stroke – or rather, a fiery haze of strokes drifting optically in space; a triumph of the de-reflective approach, driven towards capturing and mastering nature’s signals".''

Personal life
In 1956, she met Robert Chandler, from New Zealand, and they married in Split, Croatia. They had three sons, George Chandler Richard Chandler and Christopher Chandler, who ran a hedge fund business together, but now operate separately, both are billionaires.

After they sold their department store business, they gave the proceeds to their sons and went to live between Monaco and Thailand.

References

External links 
 Official website

Croatian painters
1937 births
Living people
Croatian expatriates in New Zealand
Croatian women artists
21st-century Croatian artists
21st-century women artists